The LCDR Sondes class was a class of six steam locomotives of the 4-4-0ST wheel arrangement. They were designed by Thomas Russell Crampton for the East Kent Railway (EKR) to specifications prepared by Joseph Cubitt. An order was placed in March 1857 with R. & W. Hawthorn & Co. for six locomotives at £2,700 each; they were delivered to the EKR between November 1857 and March 1858. The locomotives were prone to frequent failure: at one point, before the sixth had been received, the first five were all out of service simultaneously. The LCDR asked Daniel Gooch of the Great Western Railway to report on the condition of the locomotives; he found that there were a number of significant problems with the design. The Sondes class were all laid aside as unfit for use in mid-1863, and during 1865, all six were rebuilt by the LCDR as 2-4-0T, becoming the Second Sondes class.

Like other EKR/LCDR locomotives delivered prior to 1874, the locomotives had no numbers, being distinguished by name.

Three of the locomotives (Faversham, Chatham and Sittingbourne) were named after places served by the EKR. The other three were named after people involved in the EKR: James Lake and Lord Sondes were directors, whilst T. R. Crampton, besides being the designer of the class, was also the engineer of the EKR.

Notes

References

Sondes
4-4-0T locomotives
Railway locomotives introduced in 1857
Hawthorn locomotives
Scrapped locomotives
Standard gauge steam locomotives of Great Britain